"Fit to Be Tied Down" is a song recorded by American country music artist Sammy Kershaw. It was released in April 1997 as the fourth single from the album Politics, Religion and Her. The song reached No. 29 on the Billboard Hot Country Singles & Tracks chart.  The song was written by Wynn Varble and Charles Victor.

Chart performance

References

 

1997 singles
1996 songs
Songs written by Wynn Varble
Song recordings produced by Keith Stegall
Mercury Records singles
Sammy Kershaw songs